Merv Shaw was an Australian rules footballer for  and .

References

Australian rules footballers from South Australia
Port Adelaide Football Club (SANFL) players